Eilema bueana is a moth of the  subfamily Arctiinae. It was described by Strand in 1912. It is found in Cameroon.

References

Endemic fauna of Cameroon
bueana
Moths described in 1912